Derevnya pchelosovkhoza (Umartasılıq sovxozı) is a rural locality (a village) in Krasnoulsky Selsoviet, Gafuriysky District, Bashkortostan, Russia. The population was 169 as of 2010. There are 7 streets.

Geography 
The village is located 24 km northeast of Krasnousolsky (the district's administrative centre) by road.

References 

Rural localities in Gafuriysky District